Karen Friedman Hill (born January 16, 1946) is an American woman known for her involvement in the American Mafia through her husband Henry Hill, who was an associate of the Lucchese crime family. The events of their lives were chronicled in the 1990 film Goodfellas and several books.

Early life 
She was born in New York City and raised on Long Island around the Five Towns, the daughter of Jewish parents. She has two sisters, Sandy and Adrienne.

In 1965, Karen Friedman met Henry Hill, her future husband, through Paul Vario, who insisted that Hill accompany his son on a double date at Frank "Frankie the Wop" Manzo's restaurant, Villa Capra. According to Friedman, the date was disastrous, and Hill stood her up at the next dinner date. Afterwards, the two began going on dates at the Copacabana and other nightclubs, where Friedman was introduced to Hill's outwardly impressive lifestyle. The two later got married in a large North Carolina wedding, attended by most of Henry Hill's gangster friends. Henry Hill stated in his 1994 book Gangsters and Goodfellas  that Tommy DeSimone tried to rape Karen.

Later life 
Henry Hill was arrested in 1980 on a narcotics-trafficking charge, and with a long sentence hanging over him, he agreed to become an informant. As a result, Karen and their two children (Gregg and Gina) entered the U.S. Marshals' Witness Protection Program with Henry in 1980, changed their names, and moved around several undisclosed locations including Seattle, Washington; Cincinnati, Ohio; Omaha, Nebraska; Butte, Montana; and Independence, Kentucky.

In 1987, Henry Hill was convicted of cocaine trafficking in a federal court in Seattle and expelled from the witness protection program. In 1990, Karen had filed for divorce after 23 years of marriage. The divorce was finalized in 2002. After their divorce, Henry remarried and fathered another child.

Karen Hill continues to use an alias to protect her identity, as do her two children, Gregg and Gina. Her children released a book in 2004, titled On the Run: A Mafia Childhood, that tells their own version of their experience with the Mafia. In the book, Gregg and Gina discuss how their maternal grandparents and Karen's two younger sisters, Sandy and Adrianne, helped take care of them, when Karen and Henry were out dealing in crime.

Henry died on June 12, 2012, at the age of 69, from heart failure in Los Angeles.

Portrayal in media 
Karen Friedman Hill was portrayed by Lorraine Bracco in the 1990 film Goodfellas, directed by Martin Scorsese, with a script based on Nicholas Pileggi's 1985 book Wiseguy.  Bracco did not meet with Karen Hill prior to filming. She was nominated for the Academy Award for Best Supporting Actress for her portrayal of Hill, but lost to Whoopi Goldberg for Ghost.

References 

1946 births
American female organized crime figures
American people of Jewish descent
American socialites
Living people
People from Long Island
People who entered the United States Federal Witness Protection Program